Reda Rekowo railway station is a railway stop serving the town of Reda, in the Pomeranian Voivodeship, Poland. The station is located on the Reda–Hel railway. The train services are operated by Przewozy Regionalne.

Train services
The station is served by the following services:

Regional services (R) Władysławowo - Reda - Gdynia Główna
Regional services (R) Hel - Władysławowo - Reda - Gdynia Główna

References 

 This article is based upon a translation of the Polish language version as of September 2016.

External links

Railway stations in Pomeranian Voivodeship
Wejherowo County